The Truce of Ratisbon, or Truce of Regensburg, concluded the War of the Reunions, fought by France against Spain and the Holy Roman Empire. The Truce was signed on 15 August 1684 at the Dominican convent in Ratisbon (now in Bavaria) between Louis XIV, the Holy Roman Emperor, Leopold I, and the Spanish King, Charles II. The Spanish were involved as the owners of the Spanish Netherlands, which were part of the Holy Roman Empire. The final agreements allowed Louis to retain Strasbourg, Luxembourg, and most other Reunion gains, but he had to hand back Courtrai and Dixmude. Luxembourg, Courtrai, and Dixmude were in the Spanish Netherlands, whereas Strasbourg had been a free imperial city. The truce was supposed to last twenty years, but Louis terminated it after four years by declaring war on the Dutch Republic on 16 November and by investing Philippsburg on 27 September 1688, thereby starting the Nine Years' War.

References

 Lynn, John A. The Wars of Louis XIV: 1667–1714. Longman, (1999). 
Wolf, John B. The Emergence of the Great Powers: 1685–1715. Harper & Row, (1962). 

Peace treaties of the Ancien Régime
Peace treaties of Spain
1684 in France
1684 in Spain
1684 treaties
Treaties of the Spanish Empire
France–Spain relations
Anti-piracy
Louis XIV
Charles II of Spain